Sapara language may refer to the following languages of the Amazon:
 Sapará language, a Cariban language
 Sápara language, or Zaparo, a Zaparoan language